Macrophycis alluaudella is a species of snout moth in the genus Macrophycis. It was described by Viette in 1964, and is known from Madagascar (including Montagne d'Ambre, the type locality).

References

Moths described in 1964
Phycitinae